Astryna or Ostrino (in ; in ; in Yiddish: אַסטרין) is a town in Grodno Region in Belarus. In 2015, its population was 1,847 inhabitants.

The village is located 19km north-east of Shchuchyn and 47km east of Grodno.

History 
Astryna was first mentioned in 1450. In 1921, its population of 1,572 included 1,067 Jews.

During World War II, the city was occupied by German troops from June 1941 unil July 1944. An open ghetto was established in October 1941. There were also Jews from others villages, including Vasilishki or Dembrovo. Shortly after October 12, 1941, about 80 Jews from the ghetto were executed at the Jewish cemetery. There were also frequent, isolated shootings of Jews in the Jewish cemetery. At the end of October 1942, the ghetto was liquidated and the Jews transported to a transit camp in Kolbassino, south of Grodno. Initially jailed in the Kolbassino camp for about a month, with about 22,000 to 28,000 Jews from nearby communities, the Ostrino Jews were sent to the Auschwitz extermination camp at the end of November 1942. Remains at the Jewish cemetery were exhumed during the recent construction of a gas pipe.

Notable People 

 Harry Austryn Wolfson (1887-1974), historian and professor at Harvard University.

References

External links 
 (ru) topographic maps

Urban-type settlements in Belarus
Populated places in Grodno Region
Vilnius Voivodeship
Lidsky Uyezd
Nowogródek Voivodeship (1919–1939)
Jewish Belarusian history
Holocaust locations in Belarus
Mass murder in 1941
Jewish communities destroyed in the Holocaust